Corium or Korion was a town of ancient Crete, near which was a temple to Athena and Lake Koresia (λίμνη Κορησία), which was Crete's only natural freshwater lake.

Its site is located near modern Voulgari Armokastella, Melampes.

References

Populated places in ancient Crete
Former populated places in Greece